The Cretaceous steppes with Caragana is a natural monument (protected areas of Ulyanovsk Oblast). It is managed by the Berezovskoe joint-stock company.

Basic special features
The Cretaceous steppes with Caragana is a clearly expressed steppe with the tracks of the former forest. Most likely, there were pine-oak scaffolding with the chalky sections. Forms have migrated from this territory and the forest became a steppe. At present in the steppe there is a very rich composition of flora. Pasture and pasturing of cattle is limited because of lack of financing, research and scientific work was not conducted.

The basis for creation of PA and its importance
It is available as a natural complex of rather good safety since the given forest-steppe file has improved more and became arable land.

References
 https://web.archive.org/web/20071231205649/http://eco.ulstu.ru/
 

Protected areas of Russia
Geography of Ulyanovsk Oblast